"The Chinese Woman" is the 90th episode of the NBC sitcom Seinfeld. This was the fourth episode for the sixth season. It aired on October 13, 1994. In this episode Jerry dates a woman who he believes is Chinese due to her name, Donna Chang, Frank Costanza retains a caped lawyer for divorce proceedings, Kramer switches to boxer shorts in hopes of impregnating a woman, and Elaine finds herself continuing to cause boyfriend trouble for her friend Noreen.

Plot
Jerry and Elaine see George's father, Frank Costanza, with a man in a cape. Jerry talks to a woman, Donna Chang, on George's phone line after the wires get crossed. He goes on a date with her because he thinks she is of Chinese descent due to her surname. On the date, Jerry learns that Donna isn't Chinese or of any other Asian background; her family shortened their name from Changstein. He suspects her of purposely perpetuating the misconception that she is Chinese because she always introduces herself with her full name and demonstrates Chinese stereotypes, such as teaching acupuncture and eating at Chinese restaurants.

When Kramer complains that his briefs shrunk in the wash, Elaine tells him he should not wear briefs because they cause infertility. Kramer goes to a fertility clinic and confirms that his sperm count is low and can only be improved if he switches to boxer shorts. Boxers make him feel uncomfortable, so he decides to go commando.

Elaine's friend Noreen has already found a new boyfriend after her breakup in the previous episode: Paul, a "long talker". Exasperated at being stuck in endless conversations with Paul when she only wants to talk to Noreen, she begins hanging up every time he answers the phone. Paul eventually suspects the anonymous caller is a man having an affair with Noreen. Elaine confesses to Noreen, who is influenced by Elaine's opinion that Paul is a boring conversationalist and breaks up with him. Jerry rebukes Elaine, arguing that she should have realized by now that she has a tremendous influence on Noreen, who both joined the army and later went AWOL according to Elaine's advice.

George learns through Donna Chang that the man in the cape is Frank's lawyer and his parents are getting a divorce. Donna talks over the phone to George's mother, Estelle, convincing her not to divorce by citing Confucius. When George introduces Donna to his parents, Estelle realizes she is not Chinese and discards her advice, deciding to proceed with the divorce. Jerry suggests to Donna that she change her name.

Elaine calls Noreen to convince her to get back together with Paul. Kramer answers, having made his move as soon as he heard of the breakup. He refuses to let Elaine talk to Noreen and says he has persuaded her to rejoin the army. While George gripes about having to go back and forth between his now separated parents, Kramer triumphantly yells to Jerry that Noreen is late for her period. (The episode leaves it ambiguous whether Noreen is in fact pregnant with Kramer's child since it is never mentioned again in the series.) Noreen goes to the edge of the Brooklyn Bridge and begins to jump off. The caped lawyer grabs her and leads her safely off the bridge.

Production
Some of Seinfeld's ad-libs were cut for time. He responded to Kramer's declaration "I feel like a naked, innocent boy roaming the countryside" with "Someone better warn the sheep quick", and when George puts his head in the oven, he improvised "George, it's an electric." Cut scenes include George angrily confronting the man in the cape. The man in the cape is played by an uncredited Larry David.

References

External links 
 

Seinfeld (season 6) episodes
1994 American television episodes
Chinese American television